Alexander (Alec) John Cameron (born 5 February 1963) is an Australian engineer and university administrator, currently serving as Vice-Chancellor and President of RMIT University.

Early life and education
Cameron was educated at Knox Grammar School (1969–1980) where he was school captain in Year 12.

He attended the University of Sydney in 1981–1985, where he graduated with a Bachelor of Science degree in Pure Mathematics and Physics in 1984, and a Bachelor of Engineering degree with First Class Honours and the University Medal in 1986.

While at Sydney University he played in the breakaway (flanker) position in the university club's first grade rugby union XV.

He was selected as the Rhodes scholar for New South Wales in 1986.  At the University of Oxford, he was a member of University College, and obtained his DPhil in the Robotics Research Group in 1989, under the supervision of Hugh Durrant-Whyte.  He was a member of Oxford University Rugby Football Club and won a Blue in Rugby in 1988.

Career
Cameron joined Philips Research Laboratories in Briarcliff Manor, New York, as a Senior Member of Research Staff from 1989 to 1993.

He then returned to Sydney in 1993 as the founding Program Director of the Australian Graduate School of Engineering Innovation; an Advanced Engineering Centre, jointly established by the University of Sydney and the University of Technology, Sydney.

Cameron then joined Telstra Corporation, holding several senior roles from 1996 to 2000.  He then held other positions in the IT sector, with Comindico, Alcatel and Sun Microsystems.

In 2003, he joined the University of New South Wales as Deputy Vice-Chancellor (Resource and Infrastructure).  In 2006, he led a review of the Faculty of Commerce and Economics and the Australian Graduate School of Management, leading to a recommendation for their merger, He was appointed as the inaugural dean to achieve this merger and lead the newly-created UNSW Business School, holding this position until December, 2012.  He was president of the Australian Business Deans' Council from 2014-2015.

Cameron commenced as Deputy Vice-Chancellor (Education) at the University of Western Australia, in January, 2013.   In 2015, he attended the Advanced Management Program at Harvard Business School.

He commenced as Vice-Chancellor and Chief Executive at Aston University in September, 2016.  In 2018, he was one of 5 candidates for The Guardian University Award for the Most Inspiring Leader. Cameron has held several Board positions in association with his role at Aston including:

 Board member of Midlands Innovation and Chair from 2019-2021.
 Board member of Universities West Midlands and Chair from 2017-2019.
 Board member of Midlands Engine from 2019-2021.
 Board member of the Greater Birmingham and Solihull Local Enterprise Partnership 2019-2021.

He commenced as Vice-Chancellor and President of RMIT University in January 2022.

Personal life 
Cameron married Elizabeth Jane Kellaway in Sydney on 18 July 1987.  They have a daughter (Molly) and son (Hugh).

Publications

References

Living people
Vice-Chancellors of Aston University
University of Sydney alumni
Alumni of University College, Oxford
Australian Rhodes Scholars
Academic staff of the University of Western Australia
Academic staff of the University of New South Wales
1963 births